The 2005 Armageddon was the sixth Armageddon professional wrestling pay-per-view (PPV) event produced by World Wrestling Entertainment (WWE). It was held exclusively for wrestlers from the promotion's SmackDown! brand division. The event took place on December 18, 2005, at the Dunkin' Donuts Center in Providence, Rhode Island.

The main event was a Hell in a Cell match between Randy Orton and The Undertaker, which Undertaker won by pinfall after performing a Tombstone piledriver. One of the predominant matches on the card was an Interpromotional tag team match between WWE Tag Team Champions Rey Mysterio and World Heavyweight Champion Batista and World Tag Team Champions Big Show and Kane. Big Show and Kane won the match after Kane pinned Mysterio following a chokeslam. Another primary match on the undercard was Booker T versus Chris Benoit in the fourth match of their "Best of 7" series for the vacant WWE United States Championship. Benoit won the match after forcing Booker to submit with the Crippler Crossface, thus earning his first victory in the series.

Production

Background
Armageddon was established in 1999 as World Wrestling Entertainment's (WWE) December pay-per-view (PPV) and was held every year except in 2001. The 2005 event was held on December 18 at the Dunkin' Donuts Center in Providence, Rhode Island. It was the sixth event in the Armageddon chronology. Like the previous year, the 2005 event featured wrestlers exclusively from the SmackDown! brand.

Storylines
The event featured six professional wrestling matches with different wrestlers involved in pre-existing scripted feuds, plots and storylines. Wrestlers were portrayed as either villains or fan favorites as they followed a series of tension-building events, which culminated in a wrestling match or series of matches. All wrestlers (aside from the one interpromotional match) belonged to the SmackDown! brand – a storyline division in which WWE assigned its employees to a different program, the other being Raw.

The main event at Armageddon was fought in a Hell in a Cell match stipulation between The Undertaker and Randy Orton. The buildup to the match began at WrestleMania 21, where The Undertaker defeated Orton, a Raw superstar at the time, in an Interpromotional match. On the June 16 episode of SmackDown!, during the third annual WWE Draft, a mock sports draft lottery in which wrestlers switched programs, Orton was drafted to the SmackDown! brand. At the August pay-per-view event, SummerSlam, Orton defeated The Undertaker, where he pinned him after performing an RKO following interference from his father, "Cowboy" Bob Orton. This led to a Handicap Casket match between Undertaker and Orton and his father at No Mercy. At the event, Orton and his father defeated Undertaker, and set the casket, which Orton locked Undertaker in, which was scripted to be on fire. The proceeding month, at Survivor Series, the Undertaker returned and attacked several SmackDown! superstars following a 5-on-5 Survivor Series match between Raw and SmackDown!. Orton, who won the match for SmackDown!, was able to escape the attack. Then, on the December 2 episode of SmackDown!, Undertaker called Orton to face him inside Hell in a Cell at Armageddon, which was made official.

The pay-per-view event featured the buildup of a rivalry among two tag teams, a group of at least two wrestlers. The two groups were Batista and Rey Mysterio versus Big Show and Kane. On the November 11 episode of SmackDown!, an Interpromotional Street Fight match was scheduled between Batista and Edge. Edge, who earlier in the night, pleaded to Batista not go through the match. Batista, however, declined to cancel the match. Outside the arena, General Manager Theodore Long was outside talking to Raw General Manager Eric Bischoff, who had just arrived to the show. As Long and Bischoff were talking, Chris Masters showed up and grabbed Long from behind and placed him in a full nelson submission hold, which he calls the Master Lock. After the assault on Long, Bischoff and Masters got into a limousine and drove away from the arena. Rey Mysterio, Matt Hardy, and John "Bradshaw" Layfield (JBL) got into JBL's limousine and followed Bishoff and Masters. Inside the arena, Kane and the Big Show showed up and chokeslammed Batista. The chokeslam resulted in Batista legitimately injuring his back. On the November 21 episode of Raw, one of WWE's primary television programs, SmackDown! superstars, Batista, Randy Orton, JBL, Rey Mysterio, and Bobby Lashley, arrived to the show's arena. The Raw superstars met the SmackDown! superstars and a brawl broke out between both rosters. The fight led to Kane and the Big Show to double chokeslam Batista on top of a car, which was scripted so that Batista could attend to his injury. On the November 25 episode of SmackDown!, Batista was scheduled to defend his World Heavyweight Championship against Orton in a No Holds Barred match. Batista retained his title after the Raw roster showed up to the arena and began a fight with the SmackDown! roster. Kane and the Big Show double chokeslammed Batista into the announcer's table.

Event

Pre-show
Prior to the pay-per-view, Jamie Noble defeated Funaki on Sunday Night Heat.

Main card
The first match was a match between Matt Hardy and John "Bradshaw" Layfield (JBL) (with Jillian Hall). JBL would have most of the offense for the entire match, since at the beginning of the match, Hardy got caught up, neck first, between the top and middle rope, and stayed there for a little while as JBL proceeded to choke, punch and kick his head in. After attacking Hardy for a few minutes, JBL illegally ripped off a turnbuckle pad, sent Hardy into it and executed a Clothesline From Hell for the win.

In the second match, The Mexicools (Super Crazy and Psicosis) faced MNM (Joey Mercury and Johnny Nitro) (with Melina). Psicosis and Super Crazy performed many high-flying moves, landing a corkscrew as well as a tope con hilo over the referee's back. Melina got involved, tripping up Psicosis and taking away his momentum. MNM used their double teaming tactics to wear down Psicosis, keeping him isolated from making the tag. Once the tag was made, Super Crazy controlled most of the offense for the rest of the match. Melina tried to get involved again, but was sent down for her troubles. Super Crazy executed a moonsault on Mercury, but Nitro broke the pinfall, leading to the Snapshot for the win.

In the third match, Booker T (with Sharmell) faced Chris Benoit in match four of a best of seven series match for the vacant WWE United States Championship. There were multiple chops and suplexes from both wrestlers. They seemed to be a little off their game however, floundering a bit at times. Several Crossface attempts, as well as a low blow/scissor kick combination from Sharmell and Booker all failed to win the match for both wrestlers. With Booker down, Benoit executed a Diving headbutt, only for a near-fall. Benoit once again went for the crossface, but this time Booker rolled through and hit referee Jim Korderas. Benoit was quick to apply the Sharpshooter, forcing Booker to submit but the referee was out. Sharmell came in and hit Benoit with the broom, but that did not affect him. As he was distracted, Booker attacked Benoit, setting up for the Book End, which was reversed into a DDT and Benoit forced Booker to submit with a Crossface for the victory.

In the fourth match, Bobby Lashley faced William Regal and Paul Burchill in a 2-on-1 Handicap Match. Lashley was in control for most of the match. He used the Dominator on Burchill to win the match.

In the fifth match, Juventud faced Kid Kash for the WWE Cruiserweight Championship. In the end, Kash went for a springboard moonsault, but caught a pair of knees to the midsection. Juventud then executed a huricanrana off the top rope, and executed a Juvi Driver for the two count. Kash countered a front flip leg drop with a Dead Level to win the title.

In the sixth match, WWE Tag Team Champions Rey Mysterio and World Heavyweight Champion Batista faced World Tag Team Champions Big Show and Kane in an Interpromotional Tag Team Champions vs Champions match. Each team demonstrated their strength, with Mysterio being the only man out of place. The match evolved into a brawl, with Batista and Big Show wrestling over the broadcast table, as Mysterio executed 619 to Kane. He went for the West Coast Pop, but Kane caught him in midair, chokeslamming him for the win.

Main event
In the main event, The Undertaker faced Randy Orton (with Bob Orton) inside Hell in a Cell. During the match, Undertaker hit Orton with a steel chair, bloodying Orton. Orton hit Undertaker with the steel steps, bloodying Undertaker also. "Cowboy" Bob Orton tried intervening, but Undertaker executed a Big Boot, causing the Cell and Bob to collide, causing a laceration. Orton executed a Diving Splash through a table on Undertaker for a near-fall. Orton ducked a punch from Undertaker that caught referee Nick Patrick, bloodying him as well. As referees and EMTs came down, Bob entered the Cell. Orton executed an RKO, but there was no referee to make the count. Charles Robinson made the count, but Undertaker kicked out at two. The Undertaker executed a Last Ride on Orton but Bob broke up the pinfall, leading Undertaker to attack Bob. Undertaker attempted a Tombstone Piledriver on Orton but Orton reversed into a Tombstone on Undertaker for a near-fall. Bob tried to get involved again but Undertaker attacked Bob. Undertaker hit Bob and Orton with an Urn and executed a Tombstone on Bob. Undertaker executed a Tombstone Piledriver on Orton to win the match.

Aftermath
In the "Best of Seven" series, Booker T ended up winning the vacant WWE United States Championship on the January 13, 2006 edition of SmackDown in Philadelphia, with the help of Randy Orton. The feud between Randy Orton and The Undertaker ended in the Hell in a Cell match after the feud ran for about nine months. Batista and Rey Mysterio, who were the WWE Tag Team Championship holders at the time, lost the title to the team of MNM after Batista suffered a legitimate injury in early 2006, sidelining him for up to seven months. Big Show and Kane continued to reign as World Tag Team Champions until April 2006.

Results

References

External links
Official Armageddon 2005 website

2006
2005 in Rhode Island
Events in Providence, Rhode Island
Professional wrestling in Providence, Rhode Island
2005 WWE pay-per-view events
December 2005 events in the United States
WWE SmackDown